Marte Dam Tak is a 1987 Indian Hindi language crime film directed by Mehul Kumar, starring Raaj Kumar, Govinda, Farah in lead roles.

Plot
Courteous Police Inspector Rane, intent on arresting notorious gangster P.C. Mathur finds himself on trial for murder and sentenced to five years behind bars, of course being framed for the murder by his enemy. Following his prison term, Rane becomes an underworld operator known as Rana, intent on seeking revenge on Mathur and killing him. He hires Jai to kill Mathur, but mistakenly kills somebody else in the process. Jai, feeling angered by his mistake gives up a life of crime to concentrate on his family, leaving Rana alone to hunt down Mathur. It is now up to Rana to fulfill his quest, but avoid being killed first by Mathur's gang.

Cast
Raaj Kumar as Sub-Inspector Rane / Rana
Govinda as Jai
Farah as Jyoti
Shakti Kapoor as Rikku
Om Puri as Daulat / D. K.
Aloknath as Judge Rameshwar Dayal 
Paresh Rawal as Inspector Khanna
Kulbhushan Kharbanda as Gangster P. C. Mathur 
Iftekhar as DCP Lal
C. S. Dubey as Tiwarilal
Sudhir Dalvi as P. C. Mathur 
Ashalata Wabgaonkar as Mrs. P. C. Mathur
Nivedita Joshi as Rajni Mathur 
Bandini Mishra as Radha
Asha Sharma as Mrs. Rameshwar Dayal
Tej Sapru as Sonu

Soundtrack
Lyrics: Ravindra Jain

External links 
 

1980s Hindi-language films
1987 films
1987 action films
Films scored by Ravindra Jain
Films directed by Mehul Kumar
Indian action films